Central Autónoma de Trabajadores Salvadoreños (CATS) is a trade union center in El Salvador. It was founded in 1966 and is affiliated with the International Trade Union Confederation.

References

Trade unions in El Salvador
International Trade Union Confederation
Trade unions established in 1966